Amyloid beta A4 precursor protein-binding family A member 3 is a protein that in humans is encoded by the APBA3 gene.

Function 

The protein encoded by this gene is a member of the X11 protein family. It is an adapter protein that interacts with the Alzheimer's disease amyloid precursor protein. This gene product is believed to be involved in signal transduction processes. This gene is a candidate gene for Alzheimer's disease.

Interactions 

APBA3 has been shown to interact with Amyloid precursor protein.

References

External links

Further reading

External links 
 PDBe-KB provides an overview of all the structure information available in the PDB for Human Amyloid-beta A4 precursor protein-binding family A member 3 (APBA3)